Daniel Teixeira (born 20 April 1968) is a Brazilian former footballer who played as a striker. After spending the initial years of his career in his native Brazil, Japan, and Portugal, he moved to Germany in 1999. In Germany, he became a prolific goalscorer in the lower divisions, and also spent two seasons in the 2. Bundesliga.

References

External links

1968 births
Living people
Footballers from Belo Horizonte
Brazilian footballers
Brazilian expatriate footballers
Association football forwards
Cruzeiro Esporte Clube players
C.S. Marítimo players
C.D. Nacional players
Vila Nova Futebol Clube players
KFC Uerdingen 05 players
1. FC Union Berlin players
Eintracht Braunschweig players
Holstein Kiel players
Rot-Weiss Essen players
2. Bundesliga players
Expatriate footballers in Germany
Expatriate footballers in Portugal
Expatriate footballers in Japan
Brazilian expatriate sportspeople in Germany
Brazilian expatriate sportspeople in Portugal
Brazilian expatriate sportspeople in Japan